Kurmannapalem is an Urban neighbourhood area of the city of Visakhapatnam, India and belongs to the Greater Visakhapatnam Municipal Corporation. It has a population of 60,588 (2001 census) and forms part of the Visakhapatnam city under Gajuwaka Revenue Mandal.

Features
 Kurmannapalem is a buzzing residential are by its proximity to international airport and major railway station at Duvvada. It is also very well connected to Vishakhapatnam's main employment hubs. Yadava Jaggaraju Peta, Prasanthinagar, Gajuwaka, Auto Nagar, and Duvvada are the surrounding areas of Kurmannapalem. 
 It is one of the most busy and growing regions of Visakhapatnam in terms of real estate, due to the presence of Vizag steelplant, Pharma city, Apparel city and SEZ regions nearby.
 The steel city bus depot is run by APSRTC; buses access all parts of the city.

Locality
Chennai-Kolkata Highway (NH 16) is the major roadways of the locality connecting the other parts of Vishakhapatnam to the neighborhood. Vishakhapatnam International Airport is 15 km from the locality and can be reached via NH16. Duvvada Railway station (2 km) is the nearest available train facility. Kurmanipalem is the local bus stand aiding the daily commute of the residents. The locality has no metro facility currently but metro is planned in future from Steel plant gate situated in Kurmannapalem to Kommadi.

Shopping and Education
Some reputed educational institutions in and around Kurmannapalem are Dr. K.K.R's Gowtham Concept, Sri Ramakrishna English Medium School, Gloria English Medium School, Bharat ITI College, and Sri Gayatri Junior College. The locality is close to some renowned multispecialty hospitals like Sree Vaishnavi Health Care and Dental, Esi Dispensary Hospital, and Sree Venkata Padmavathi Healthcare. The everyday needs are supported to the residents by Gvmc Rythu Bazar, More super markets, and Reliance Fresh a lot more.

Employment hubs
"The famous Visakhapatnam Steel Plant is only 10 km from the locality. The locality also houses many small-scale engineering work companies such as Sri Lakshmi Sai Engg. Works, Beekay Structural Steels, Vesuvius India Limited, and Jami Hydraulics Pvt. Ltd. Visakhapatnam Special Economic Zone can be reached within 3 km. Varma IT Services RISE ENTERRISES - ""The ultimate Solution"", Abhinav Group, BI Experts Pvt Ltd, Cyphare Intelligence Private Limited, and SlickPOS are the few other IT/ITeS providing employment opportunities. The Shipyard of Vishakhapatnam is only 12 km from Kurmannapalem

Transport
APSRTC routes

References

Neighbourhoods in Visakhapatnam